Genesee Township may refer to the following places in the United States:

 Genesee Township, Whiteside County, Illinois
 Genesee Township, Michigan
 Genesee Township, Potter County, Pennsylvania

See also
 Geneseo Township (disambiguation)
 Genesee (disambiguation)

Township name disambiguation pages